In Mandaean scriptures, Shishlam (often transcribed Šišlam) is a figure representing the prototypical priest or prototypical Mandaean. He is also frequently referred to in Mandaean texts as Šišlam Rabba, which literally translates as the Great Šišlam.

In Mandaean scriptures
In Mandaean texts, Shishlam communicates with uthras from the World of Light and partakes in rituals to re-establish laufa (spiritual connection) with the World of Light. Hence, Shishlam is essentially a literary personification or representation of the Mandaean who is participating in the ritual that the text is being used for.

The Wedding of the Great Šišlam, a ritual text used during Mandaean wedding ceremonies, is named after Shishlam.

As the priestly prototype or archetype, Shishlam features prominently in several Mandaean priestly esoteric texts used during tarmida and ganzibra initiation ceremonies. These texts include:
The 1012 Questions, which mentions Shishlam as the son of Nbat, or alternatively as the son of Adam S'haq Rba (literally 'Adam was bright, the Great'). ʿZlat (literally 'she wove'), described as the "Wellspring of Light," is mentioned as Shishlam's wife or female consort. In Book 2, Part 5.2 of The 1012 Questions, Shishlam is also mentioned as the son of Lihdaia Rba Zadiqa (the "Unique Great Holy One"; or "Unique Great Righteous One," see Right Ginza 9.2).
The Coronation of the Great Šišlam
The Scroll of Exalted Kingship
Alma Rišaia Rba
Alma Rišaia Zuṭa

Feast

Shishlam is celebrated on Dehwa d-Šišlam Rabba ("Feast of the Great Shishlam"), celebrated annually by Mandaeans on the 6th and 7th days of the 1st month.

See also
Self in Jungian psychology, a Jungian archetype
Adam kasia
Mandaean priest
Zlat

References

Mandaeism
Mythological archetypes
Conceptions of self

Personifications in Mandaeism